The Yazidis in Georgia are a part of the Yazidis who fled from the Ottoman Empire due to persecution in the 19th and early 20th centuries and sought refuge in Georgia.

History 
The Yazidis in Georgia are among the poorest and most persecuted people in Georgia. In the Soviet Union there was almost no contact between Yazidis in Georgia and Yazidis in Armenia with the Yazidis in Iraq, Turkey and Syria. In 1989 there were 33,000 Yazidis in Georgia. After the collapse of the Soviet Union in the 1990s, thousands of Yazidis fled from Georgia to Germany because of persecution and discrimination. In 2008, the number of Yazidis in Georgia was 12,000.

In 1919 the Yazidis received permission from the Georgian government to register an organization called The Yezidi Ethno-Nationality Consultative Council in Tbilisi.  The Yazidi organization stated that the Yazidis consider themselves as a separate nationality.

References 

Yazidis in Georgia (country)
Ethnic groups in Georgia (country)
Religion in Georgia (country)
Yazidi diaspora